Charles J. Schmidt (March 20, 1907 – September 8, 1966) was an American politician and businessman. He was a member of the Wisconsin State Assembly and the Wisconsin State Senate.

Biography
Schmidt was born on March 20, 1907 in Milwaukee, Wisconsin. He attended South Division High School and the University of Wisconsin. He worked as an interior decorator and in real estate and insurance. He was also an inspector for the Wisconsin Industrial Commission and for the United States Department of Labor. During World War II, he was a member of the Wisconsin National Guard.

A Roman Catholic, Schmidt was a member of the Knights of Columbus and the Society of the Holy Name. Schmidt was married to Rae Mary Netzhammer. He died of cancer on September 8, 1966.

Political career
From 1949 to 1963, Schmidt served in the Wisconsin State Assembly as a Democrat. In 1962, he was elected to the Wisconsin State Senate from the 5th District. He resigned from the position in 1964 following his election to the Milwaukee Common Council, a position he held until his death from cancer in 1966.

References

External links
The Political Graveyard

Catholics from Wisconsin
Democratic Party Wisconsin state senators
Democratic Party members of the Wisconsin State Assembly
Milwaukee Common Council members
Military personnel from Wisconsin
Wisconsin National Guard personnel
United States Army personnel of World War II
United States Department of Labor officials
Insurance agents
American interior designers
University of Wisconsin–Madison alumni
1907 births
1966 deaths
Deaths from cancer in Wisconsin
20th-century American politicians
South Division High School alumni